Julián Ruiz (born 25 February 1960) is a Spanish handball player. He competed at the 1984 Summer Olympics and the 1988 Summer Olympics.

References

1960 births
Living people
Spanish male handball players
Olympic handball players of Spain
Handball players at the 1984 Summer Olympics
Handball players at the 1988 Summer Olympics
Place of birth missing (living people)
Sportspeople from Santander, Spain